Theophilus Annorbaah (born 17 September 1989) is a Ghanaian professional footballer who currently plays for Medeama SC and the Ghana national football team.

Club career
Theophilus Annorbaah played for Ghana Premier League club Ashanti Gold SC, prior to signing for Ghana Premier League club and Tarkwa based Medeama SC in May 2011. On 14 July 2013, Annorbaah won his first title with his club Medeama, after a 1–0 win over Asante Kotoko in the final of the Ghanaian FA Cup.

International career
In November 2013, coach Maxwell Konadu invited Annorbaah to be included in the Ghana national football team for the 2013 WAFU Nations Cup. He helped the Ghana national football team to a first-place finish after the Ghana national football team beat Senegal national football team by three goals to one. Annorbaah was included in the Ghana national football team for the 2014 African Nations Championship that finished runner-up.

International goal
Scores and results list Ghana national football team's goal tally first.

Honours

Club
Medeama SC
Ghanaian FA Cup Winner: 2013

National Team 

 WAFU Nations Cup Winner: 2013
 African Nations Championship Runner-up: 2014

References

1989 births
Living people
Ghanaian footballers
WAFU Nations Cup players
Ashanti Gold SC players
Ghana international footballers
Medeama SC players
Association football midfielders
People from Tema
Association football forwards
Ghana Premier League players
2014 African Nations Championship players
Ghana A' international footballers